Drangovo may refer to the following villages in Bulgaria:
 Drangovo, Blagoevgrad Province
 Drangovo, Kardzhali Province
 , in Brezovo Municipality